Jan Zahradníček (17 January 1905, Mastník − 10 October 1960, Vlčatín) was a Czech poet, journalist and translator.

He was one of the most important Czech Catholic poets of the 20th century. Because of his faith and his anti-totalitarian work, he was imprisoned as an enemy of the Communist Party after the Communist coup of 1948.

Biography
From 1919 to 1926 he studied at Třebíč gymnasium. He then studied literature and comparative literature at the Charles University in Prague. Among his teachers were the literary critic František Xaver Šalda and the writer Václav Tille. In 1936 he moved to Uhřínov to translate and write poetry. From 1940 until 1948 he was the editor of Akord Revue in Brno. In 1945, he became the editor of Brněnské tiskárny (a publishing house).

In June 1951 he was arrested by the Communist secret police (StB) and sentenced to 13 years' imprisonment. In 1960 he was granted amnesty due to his worsening health. He died in the same year, in an ambulance while passing through the municipality of Vlčatín. He was buried in Uhřínov.

He had four children, two daughters died from mushroom poisoning in the time of his imprisonment.

Published works

 1930 − Pokušení smrti
 1933 − Jeřáby
 1935 − Žíznivé léto 
 1937 − Pozdravení slunci 
 1940 − Korouhve 
 1947 − La Saletta 
 1948 − Znamení moci, an anti-Communist poetry collection censored by the Communist regime; a translation of Dante Alighieri's Divina comedia which could not be published under Zahradníček's name.
 
Verse books from prison Čtyři léta and Dům strach were published in exile (Canada) during the 1970s.

References

1905 births
1960 deaths
People from Třebíč District
20th-century Czech poets
20th-century male writers
Czech male poets
Czech Catholic poets
Catholic poets
Czech Roman Catholics
Czechoslovak prisoners and detainees
Prisoners and detainees of Czechoslovakia
Recipients of the Order of Tomáš Garrigue Masaryk
Charles University alumni